Geylang Serai Constituency was a single member constituency within Geylang Serai, Singapore that existed in pre-independence era of 1959 elections by carving a portion from its predecessor constituency, Ulu Bedok Constituency  It had remained itself all the way until prior to 1988 elections where it is merged into Marine Parade Group Representation Constituency.

Member of Parliament

Elections

Elections in 1950s

Elections in 1960s

Elections in 1970s

Elections in 1980s

See also
Marine Parade GRC
Ulu Bedok ward

References

1972 GE's result
1976 GE's result
1980 GE's result
1984 GE's result
1988 GE's result
Brief History on Singapore Alliance

Subdivisions of Singapore